Questioning French Secularism: Gender Politics and Islam in a Parisian Suburb is a 2012 book by Jennifer Selby, in which the author examines how contemporary secularism in France is positioned as a guarantor of women’s rights.

References

External links 
 Questioning French Secularism: Gender Politics and Islam in a Parisian Suburb

2012 non-fiction books
Islamic clothing controversy in France
Palgrave Macmillan books